All the Right Reasons is the fifth studio album by Canadian rock band Nickelback, released on October 4, 2005, on Roadrunner Records. It is the band's first album with former 3 Doors Down drummer Daniel Adair, who replaced Ryan Vikedal in January 2005. The album topped the Canadian Albums Chart and the US Billboard 200 albums chart and has sold 11 million copies worldwide. It is Nickelback's best-selling album to date, according to certifications from the CRIA, the RIAA, the BPI, and the ARIA. Seven singles were released from the album. The album re-entered the Finland Albums Chart in 2010, setting a new peak position at number 21.

All the Right Reasons was certified diamond by the RIAA in March 2017 and had sold 7.96 million copies in the US as of December 2015, making it one of the best-selling albums of all time in the US. In Canada, All the Right Reasons was certified 7× Platinum by the CRIA in March 2010.

Critical reception

The album received mixed to negative reviews, currently holding a score of 41 based on nine critics on Metacritic. However, Entertainment Weekly explained the album's success this way: "What if Nickelback's decision to let the music speak for itself is, ironically, their biggest selling point of all?" Kelefa Sanneh of The New York Times criticized the lyrical content of the album, referring to it as "another brash but sullen CD with more of the worst rock lyrics ever recorded."

Commercial performance
The album was the third straight No. 1 album for the band in their native Canada. It sold more than 60,000 copies in its first week, topping their previous number 1 albums Silver Side Up and The Long Road (selling 43,000 and 45,000 copies). The album debuted at number one on the US Billboard 200 chart, selling 323,350 copies in its first week in the United States. In the United States the album to date has sold over 8 million copies and was found again inside the top 10 of the Billboard 200 in its 99th, 100th, 101st, and 102nd weeks on the chart. The album had never been below number 30 on the Billboard 200 in 110 weeks, making Nickelback the first act to have an album in the top thirty of the Billboard 200 for its first 100 weeks since Shania Twain's 1997 album Come On Over stayed in the top thirty for 123 consecutive weeks following its release.

In addition, the album has spawned five top-twenty Hot 100 singles in the U.S.: "Photograph", "Savin' Me", "Far Away", "If Everyone Cared", and "Rockstar", making it one of only a handful of rock albums to ever produce five or more top-twenty U.S. hits. "Photograph", "Far Away", and "Rockstar" were all top ten singles on the Hot 100, making Nickelback the first rock band of the 2000s (decade) to have three top-ten hits from the same album.

In the UK, the album opened its chart run at number 13 before quickly leaving the top 75 with no top 20 singles, with "Savin' Me" being their first to miss the top 75 altogether. While being the band's smallest-selling UK album since Curb, it experienced, in early 2008, a resurrection due to the single "Rockstar" becoming Nickelback's highest-charting single ever in the UK. The album has now outpeaked its previous peak of number 13, reaching number 2 and has since been certified Platinum.

It was ranked number 13 on Billboard'''s 200 Albums of the Decade.

Track listing
Standard edition

Special editionAll the Right Reasons: Special edition'' was released on July 10, 2007. It is a two-disc set and includes a Nickelback wallpaper, as well as three live tracks and a remixed version of "Photograph" as bonus tracks. The bonus DVD includes four videos, a behind-the-scenes tour diary, and interviews.

Special edition
"Photograph" 
"Animals" 
"Follow You Home" 
Wal-Mart exclusive special edition
"Never Again" 
Special edition DVD
"Photograph" 
"Savin' Me" 
"Far Away" 
"If Everyone Cared" 
Behind-the-scenes tour diary
Interviews

15th Anniversary Edition
"We Will Rock You" 
"Photograph" 
"Too Bad" 
"Someday" 
Disc 2 (Live at Buffalo Chip, Sturgis, South Dakota, August 8th, 2006)
"Intro/Animals"
"Woke Up This Morning"
"Photograph" 
"Because of You"
"Far Away" 
"Never Again"
"Savin' Me"
"Someday"
"Side of A Bullet"
"How You Remind Me"
"Too Bad"
"Figured You Out"

Personnel

Nickelback
 Chad Kroeger – lead vocals, lead guitar
 Ryan Peake – rhythm guitar, backing vocals
 Mike Kroeger – bass, backing vocals
 Daniel Adair – drums, backing vocals

Musicians
 Timmy Dawson – piano on "Savin' Me" and "If Everyone Cared", acoustic guitar (15th Anniversary Disc 2) on “Savin’ Me” and "Someday" 
 Dimebag Darrell – guitar solo (sample) on "Side of a Bullet"
 Chris Gestrin – organ on "Rockstar"
 Billy Gibbons – guitar and backing vocals on "Follow You Home", "Fight for All the Wrong Reasons" and "Rockstar"
 Brian Larson – synthesizer strings on "Far Away"

Technical
 Ryan Andersen – digital editing
 Richard Beland – photography
 Zach Blackstone – mixing assistance
 Kevin Estrada – photography
 Ted Jensen – mastering
 Joey Moi – production, engineering, digital editing
 Mike Shipley – mixing on "Photograph" and "Far Away"
 Randy Staub – mixing
 Brian Wohlgemuth – mixing assistance on "Photograph" and "Far Away"

Charts

Weekly charts

Year-end charts

Decade-end charts

Certifications

References

External links
Nickelback official website
Nickelback Fan Club website

Nickelback albums
2005 albums
EMI Records albums
Roadrunner Records albums
Albums produced by Joey Moi
Juno Award for Rock Album of the Year albums